In computing, diskpart is a command-line disk partitioning utility included in Windows 2000 and later Microsoft operating systems, replacing its predecessor, fdisk. The command is also available in ReactOS.

Overview 
The diskpart is a utility used for partitioning internal hard drives but can also format removable media such as flash drives.

Although theoretically it is possible to create in Windows NT 4.0 / 2000 / XP on removable drives such as flash drives or memory cards for example during system installation. However, the ability to format, for example, the Recovery Console, is completely blocked to format such a disk. A message will appear: 'Cannot format removable disk'. Microsoft noticed this error. And it completely blocked the ability to view and create partitions from Windows Vista to Windows 10.

The command supports the use of scripts to automate its usage.  For example, the following text file could be supplied to diskpart to create a new partition:

 create partition logical size=2048
 assign letter=F

This will create a 2 GB logical partition at the beginning of the free space on the disk and assign it the drive letter F:, provided that space requirements are met.

The installed disks and their associated volumes and/or partitions can be viewed by these commands:

 list disk
 list volume
 list partition

To select it, the sel command is used.
The clean command is used to either perform a "quick" disk wiping while adding the all argument zeroes the entire partition/disk.
The ReactOS version was developed by Lee Schroeder and is licensed under the GPLv2.

Recovery Console

On the Recovery Console, which is included in all Windows 2000, Windows XP and Windows Server 2003, there is a diskpart command which is significantly different from the one included in the actual operating system.  It only provides functionality for adding and deleting partitions, but not for setting an active partition.

See also
Logical Disk Manager
Disk Utility
parted, cfdisk
List of disk partitioning software
Windows Imaging Format
Loop devices
PartitionMagic

References

Footnotes

Citations

Further reading

External links

Windows administration
Hard disk software
Disk partitioning software